Strømmen Storsenter is a Norwegian shopping centre located in Strømmen, just outside Oslo, Norway.

History
Strømmen Storsenter was built on the site of Strømmen Stål, which had closed in the 1970s. It was opened in 1985, with 39 stores, and in 1990 it expanded by another 50. 
It has been expanded several times since then, the last time in October 2012 with 80 new businesses. Today the shopping centre holds over 200 stores and restaurants, and 2100 parking spots, most of them inside. 
In 2009 it had a turnover of 2.066 billion Norwegian kroner. In 2009 over four million people visited the mall. It has a size of 65,000 m2 distributed over three floors where 2000 employees work. It is now known as the largest shopping mall in Norway.

Strømmen Storsenter is owned by the Olav Thon Group which in turn is owned by the Olav Thon Foundation. Olav Thon Group operates primarily in the retail and hotel sectors. It operates shopping centers located in Norway and Sweden, as well as Thon Hotels, which is one of Norway's leading hotel chains.

Gallery

References

External links
Strømmen Storsenter   website

Buildings and structures in Viken
Shopping centres in Norway
Shopping malls established in 1985
Skedsmo
Tourist attractions in Viken
1985 establishments in Norway